Chad C. Anderson (born 20 June 1980) is an American entrepreneur and executive, best known as CEO of Space Angels.

Education 
Anderson holds an MBA degree from the University of Oxford and Finance and Economics undergraduate degrees from Seattle University, magna cum laude.

Career 
Anderson has been described as “among the best-positioned people on either the investment or the operator side to weigh in on the current and future state of the space startup industry”.

Anderson founded Space Capital, an early-stage venture capital firm that invests exclusively in space-based technologies, with Tom Ingersoll.

Since 2012, Anderson has served as CEO of Space Angels, an angel investment and venture capital platform focused on early-stage investments in the space economy.

Anderson also serves on several boards, including the Satellite Applications Catapult in the United Kingdom, an innovation and technology company, created to foster growth across the economy through the exploitation of space.

Previously, Anderson was Business Manager at JPMorgan Chase where he managed a $50 billion real estate portfolio through the Great Recession.

Exploration 
Anderson is a Member Resident of the Explorers Club in New York City. Over the course of eight days in July 2017, Chad Anderson and Justin Fornal, along with Whisky Ambassador Johnnie Mundell, became the first people in history to swim around the island of Islay Scotland. Their expedition, the Great Islay Swim, set out to build on the work of the late historian Alfred Barnard who walked the island in the 1880s while writing his book The Whisky Distilleries of the United Kingdom.

Over the course of the expedition, the swimmers stopped by each of the operating distilleries, filling a 30 gallon oak cask with selected whiskies from each. The resulting pillage blend was bottled by Single Cask Nation and sold to benefit the Royal National Lifeboat Institution.

References 

1980 births
21st-century American businesspeople
Living people
Alumni of the University of Oxford
Seattle University alumni
American expatriates in the United Kingdom
American venture capitalists
American corporate directors
People from New York City